Saxon Switzerland National Park, is a national park in the German Free State of Saxony, near the Saxon capital Dresden. It  covers two areas of 93.5 km² (36.1 mi²) in the heart of the German part of the Elbe Sandstone Mountains, which is often called (the) Saxon Switzerland.

The national park adjoins Bohemian Switzerland National Park in the Czech Republic.

Geography

Location 
The National Park is situated in the centre of a natural area of almost 710 km² (274 mi²). This region, called Saxon Switzerland is cultivated by humans in many places. Smaller towns and villages such as Bad Schandau or Königstein in the district of Sächsische Schweiz are part of this region.

The core area of the National Park has a quiescent area of 40% and is covered almost completely by woodland. The status of National Park, which grants the highest natural protection in Germany, was attributed in 1990. The park lies – in two geographically separate areas – within the district of Sächsische Schweiz-Osterzgebirge.

Landscape 
Saxon Switzerland is an intensively fissured and rocky canyon landscape. The highest peak of the National Park is at 556 meters (1,814 feet) above sea level, but is only a short distance from the valley of the Elbe river at 110 to 120 meters (360 to 390 feet). It offers several different habitats and microclimate zones due to its strong vertical division. The National Park still hosts some forms of forest without human intervention, which is unusual in central Europe. The special forms of mountain forest and gorge forest are endangered in Europe generally. Because of the sabulous soil and fissures, many places in this area are drier than normal for the temperate zone.

Western region 
This region includes the Bastei area, the Lilienstein and the Polenz valley. In the west it is bordered by Wehlen and Lohmen, in the north by Lohmen and Hohnstein, in the east by Hohnstein and Goßdorf and in the south by Porschdorf, Rathen and Wehlen. The municipality of Waitzdorf lies entirely within the western region. Important peaks are the Lilienstein (415 m), the Bastei (305 m), the Hockstein and the Brand (317 m). The Grünbach and the associated lake of Amselsee and the Polenz are the only noteworthy bodies of water.

Eastern region 
The eastern region includes the area of the Schrammsteine rocks, the Großer Winterberg mountain, the Großer Zschand valley and the hinterland of Saxon Switzerland (Hinterer Sächsischen Schweiz). To the west it is bordered by Bad Schandau and Altendorf and to the north by Altendorf, Ottendorf and Hinterhermsdorf. To the east and south it is bordered by the Bohemian Switzerland National Park. From Schmilka to Bad Schandau the Elbe forms the southern boundary of this region. Important peaks are the Großer Winterberg (556 m), the Kuhstall (337 m) and the Raumberg (459 m). The Kirnitzsch is the only noteworthy body of water.

Tourism and recreation
 The definition of national Park is, in some cases, in conflict with tourism and recreation. One objective is to raise the inviolate area to 75%, which means limiting the areas of hiking and climbing.

The development of the network of paths in today's national park took place in the first half of the 19th century and completed at the beginning of the 20th century. The historical route guides illustrate it thoroughly (e.g., Meinhold's route guide). The first hiking restrictions were declared as early as in the 1980s (Thorwalder Wände ridge path). Today the National Park has a marked network of 400 km of hiking trails, numerous mountain restaurants, and some 50 km of cycling trails. It is compulsory to use marked routes in the National Park. Though visitors may use all paths outside the core zone, only marked trails are allowed within the core zone.

The painter's way

The painter's way (Malersweg in German) represents only a small part of the park area, but due to its beauty and being a well-developed trail, most visitors prefer it for hiking. The Bastei bridge is the first view of the Valley for many visitors and is extensively photographed and documented.

Rock climbing 
The peculiar form of the sandstone cliffs in Saxon Switzerland national park attracts crowds of climbers every year. However, since these cliffs are sandstone, it is important to treat them with cautioun. 

The following rules, introduced at the beginning of the 20th century, are in place to preserve the national park sandstones:

 Visitors are not permitted to climb when the rock is wet or crumbling.
 Ropes are only allowed for safety purposes and abseiling.
 Metal safety equipment, such as chock-stones and solid rings, are forbidden.
 Visitors are not allowed to use chemical aids such as magnesia.
 The rock surface must not be modified – except to attach retaining rings on first ascents.

Information posts 
 National Park Headquarters
 National Park Centre in Bad Schandau
 National Park Office in Bad Schandau
 Information posts
 Schweizerhaus on the Bastei
 Amselfall mountain hut
 Log cabin on the Brand
 Eishaus on the Großer Winterberg
 Armoury in the Großer Zschand
 Haus Beize and Waldhusche in Hinterhermsdorf

Points of interest

 Pflanzengarten Bad Schandau, a regional botanical garden
 Bastei Bridge

See also
Bohemian Switzerland

References

External links

Nationalpark Sächsische Schweiz

National parks of Germany
Protected areas of Saxony
Protected areas established in 1990
Elbe Sandstone Mountains
Saxon Switzerland
1990 establishments in East Germany